The Red Wall Gang was a drug dealing/joyriding gang, who operated in the Cherry Orchard area of Ballyfermot in west Dublin, Ireland from the late 1980s to the mid-1990s. By 1995, the red wall around which they gathered was a major hub in Ireland's illegal drug trade. They are known for the area's 1995 Halloween riot.

References

Irish criminals
Organised crime groups in Ireland